Bruce Gotz (21 July 1913 – 19 March 1993) was an Australian rules footballer who played with St Kilda in the Victorian Football League (VFL).

He was the son of Carlton and Port Melbourne player, Martin Gotz.

Notes

External links 

1913 births
1993 deaths
Australian rules footballers from Victoria (Australia)
St Kilda Football Club players